Justin Ferizaj (born 13 January 2005) is an Irish professional footballer currently playing as a midfielder for Shamrock Rovers.

Club career
Ferizaj's parents migrated from Albania to Dublin before he was born, and he joined Tallaght-based Shamrock Rovers as a child. Having progressed through the academy, he made his league debut in the 2022 season, in a 2–1 win over St Patrick's Athletic.

The same year, he went on trial with German side Hamburg, before turning down a contract offer from Italian side Sampdoria. After impressive performances, being lauded for his ability to step up to senior level, he signed a new contract with Shamrock Rovers in July 2022.

Ferizaj spent time on trial at Tottenham Hotspur during the off season from Rovers, after receiving permission from the club.

He scored his first goal at senior level on 13 March 2023 in a 2–1 Leinster Senior Cup defeat away to Bray Wanderers at the Carlisle Grounds.

International career
Ferizaj is eligible to represent the Republic of Ireland and Albania. He has represented the Republic of Ireland at youth international level.

Career statistics

Club

Notes

References

2005 births
Living people
Association footballers from Dublin (city)
Republic of Ireland association footballers
Republic of Ireland youth international footballers
Irish people of Albanian descent
Association football midfielders
League of Ireland players
Shamrock Rovers F.C. players